{{DISPLAYTITLE:C13H21N3O}}
The molecular formula C13H21N3O (molar mass: 235.32 g/mol, exact mass: 235.1685 u) may refer to:

 PF-592,379
 Procainamide (PCA)

Molecular formulas